Brian Joseph Scott (born January 12, 1988) is an American former professional stock car racing driver.

Racing career

Beginnings
Scott has been racing competitively since the age of 12. One of his early career highlights came at the 360 Nationals at Skagit Speedway in Alger, Washington, when he competed against an elite field of dirt racers and brought home an impressive second-place finish. He recently was the first Idaho native to make a debut at the Daytona 500.

NASCAR

Camping World Truck Series
While splitting time between USAR and Late Models, Scott's father, JB, announced he had purchased the NASCAR Camping World Truck Series team Xpress Motorsports. Scott then made his NASCAR debut at the Smith's Las Vegas 350 and in 2008 moved to the Trucks full-time to run for and eventually finish second for the Rookie of the Year. Albertsons became the team's new sponsor and after a change to Toyota they end the year strong with five top-tens in the last seven races, including a second-place finish at the season-ending Ford 200. He went on to finish out his Truck resume with a win in the 2009 AAA Insurance 200 at Dover International Speedway, twenty top-tens, nine top-fives, and several runner up finishes. On November 9, 2012, Scott added his second win in the NASCAR Camping World Truck Series at Phoenix International Raceway in the Lucas Oil 150 and delivered Kyle Busch Motorsports their second win of the season.

Xfinity Series

His Nationwide Series debut came in 2009 with seven starts in the series driving No. 10 and No. 11 for Braun Racing. Scott's first full season in the Nationwide Series was completed in 2010 with one Top 5 and five Top 10 finishes en route to finishing the season as the runner-up for Raybestos Rookie of the Year honors. Scott ran the first 28 races in the Braun Racing No. 11 but was released from the ride when Steve Turner bought the team. Scott finished the season in the RAB Racing No. 09. 

Scott joined Joe Gibbs Racing in 2011 driving No. 11. His 2011 Nationwide Series campaign earned him two top-five finishes, seven top-10 finishes and one pole under the Joe Gibbs Racing banner. He also scored the Featherlite Most Improved driver of the year award. Scott finished eighth in the Nationwide Series point standings in 2011.

Scott and crew chief Kevin Kidd returned to the No. 11 team in 2012, gaining a sponsorship from Dollar General. In addition, Scott signed to drive the No. 18 in the Camping World Truck Series for Kyle Busch Motorsports in a few races. Scott would have a best finish of 3rd at Dover in the Nationwide Series, and returned to Victory Lane in the Truck Series at Phoenix. However, Scott would later be released from JGR in favor of championship runner-up Elliott Sadler. Scott later took over Sadler's previous No. 2 ride at Richard Childress Racing.

Scott earned his career best finish of 2nd at Indianapolis Motor Speedway in 2013 after getting by Kyle Busch on a late race restart. Busch passed him only two laps later and Scott had to settle for second. At Richmond International Raceway that September Scott started on the pole and led 239 of 250 laps before being passed by Brad Keselowski and finishing second. Scott had a remarkable 2014 season, earning 23 top ten finishes and finished 4th in the championship standings.

Sprint Cup Series

In August 2013, it was announced that Scott would make his debut in the Sprint Cup Series, driving the No. 33 for RCR in the Bank of America 500 at Charlotte Motor Speedway. Scott started the race in 19th, and finished 27th, four laps down. Scott returned to the No. 33 for the 2014 Daytona 500. At Daytona, Scott led some laps and was collected in the big one late in the race. At Fontana a few weeks later, he tangled with Aric Almirola when Almirola lifted the throttle, causing Scott to run into the back of Almirola and wrecking both cars.

At Talladega, Scott won his first career Sprint Cup pole for the 2014 Aaron's 499 in the 33. In round #2, Scott had driven his fastest lap and for a total of 5 rounds, nobody was able to break the track record. In the race, Scott ran in the top 15 the entire race but was collected in "The Big One" that struck with 45 laps to go.

It was announced that Scott would drive the No. 29 for RCR in the 2015 Daytona 500, however just before the entry list was released, RCR cancelled plans to field the car for him. Instead, he was hired to drive the No. 62 Chevrolet of Premium Motorsports with RCR support, though Shore Lodge still sponsored the effort. Scott failed to qualify for the Daytona 500. Scott then successfully qualified RCR's No. 33 entry the next week at Atlanta. However, after Michael Annett failed to qualify, Scott gave up his ride to allow the Sprint Cup regular to earn driver points. After that, Scott finished 13th at Las Vegas, then his best finish in the series.

On December 9, 2015, Richard Petty Motorsports announced that Scott would take over Sam Hornish Jr.'s No. 9 ride for the 2016 season. The car was later renumbered to No. 44.

Scott started the 2016 season crashing on the last lap in his Can-Am Duel qualifying race. Then at Auto Club Speedway, Scott scored a career-best 12th-place finish. After a dismal 2016 with no top 10s going into October, he finished second on the bumper of Joey Logano's car at Talladega. It was the first top 5 and 10 in his career, his first top 10 for Richard Petty Motorsports, and his best career finish.

On November 10, 2016, Scott announced his retirement from NASCAR competition following the remainder of the 2016 season. Scott finished 15th in his last NASCAR race at Homestead.

Return to Xfinity Series
On July 3, 2017, Scott announced that he would come out of retirement to drive the No. 3 Chevrolet for Richard Childress Racing at Iowa and Kentucky in July and September respectively. In his first race of 2017 at Iowa, Scott finished a strong 3rd place.

Personal life

Scott's father Joe "J.B." Scott is the owner of the Shore Lodge and Whitetail Club resorts in McCall, Idaho. Scott is also the great-grandson of Joe Albertson and Kathryn Albertson, the founders of the Albertsons enterprise. The companies have sponsored Scott for much of his career.

Scott married Whitney Kay in the offseason of 2014–2015 at Shore Lodge. She has a daughter, Brielle, from a previous relationship (with former racing driver Sean Caisse). The two of them have a son together.

Motorsports career results

NASCAR
(key) (Bold – Pole position awarded by qualifying time. Italics – Pole position earned by points standings or practice time. * – Most laps led.)

Sprint Cup Series

Daytona 500

Xfinity Series

Camping World Truck Series

 Season still in progress 
 Ineligible for series points

ARCA Re/Max Series
(key) (Bold – Pole position awarded by qualifying time. Italics – Pole position earned by points standings or practice time. * – Most laps led.)

References

External links

 
 

Living people
1988 births
Sportspeople from Boise, Idaho
Racing drivers from Idaho
NASCAR drivers
ARCA Menards Series drivers
CARS Tour drivers
Joe Gibbs Racing drivers
Richard Childress Racing drivers
Kyle Busch Motorsports drivers